The 2021–22 Maltese FA Trophy, officially named IZIBET FA Trophy due to sponsorship reasons, is the 84th edition of the football cup competition, the FA Trophy. The winners of the Maltese FA Trophy will earn a place in the first qualifying round of the 2022–23 UEFA Europa Conference League. The first round of games started on 7 December 2021.

There was no winner of the previous cup because the Malta FA Executive Committee cancelled the competition due to the COVID-19 pandemic in Malta.

Preliminary round 
Fourteen preliminary round matches played on 7-9 December 2021. The draw for the preliminary round was held on 19 November 2021.

Round Of 32 
Sixteen Matches will be played on 8-10 February and 15–16 February. The draw for the Round Of 32 and Round of 16 was held on 8 January 2021.
The Round Of 32 featured all 12 clubs across the Premier League, who entered the competition in this round.

Round Of 16 
The draw for the Round Of 32 and Round of 16 was held on 8 January 2021. The matches were played during the week on 15 and 16 of March 2022. In the Round Of 16 there are 11 clubs from Maltese Premier League and 5 clubs from Maltese Challenge League left.

Quarter-finals
The draw for the Quarter-finals and Semi-finals was held on 5 March 2022. The matches played on 16 and 18 of April 2022. In the Quarter-finals there are 7 clubs from Maltese Premier League and 1 club from Maltese Challenge League left. Three matches (Except Gżira United vs Santa Lucia) were Live on TVMNews+

Semi-finals
The draw for the Quarter-finals and Semi-finals was held on 5 March 2022. The matches will be played on 10 and 11 of May 2022. In the Semi-finals there are 4 clubs left. All from Maltese Premier League. Both Semi-final matches were Live on TVMNews+

Final
The final played on 15 May 2022.

Valletta reached their twenthy-five Maltese FA Trophy finals having won it fourteen times. Floriana reached their thirty-two finals and had won it twenty times previously.
Valletta and Floriana have met together in Maltese FA Trophy final seven times before, having previously met in 1957, 1960, 1976, 1977, 1978, 1994 and 2011.
When meeting in the finals, Valletta won three Times (1960, 1977 and 1978). Floriana won Four Times (1957, 1976, 1994 and 2011).
The last time Valletta and Floriana met together in the FA Trophy was the 2010–11 season in the final when Floriana beat Valletta by 1–0.

Statistics

Top scorers

See also 
 2021–22 Maltese Premier League

References

External links 
 Official FA Trophy website

Malta
2021–22
Cup